Acony may refer to:
Acony (manga), a manga series written and illustrated by the manga artist Kei Toume.
Acony Records, a record label founded by Gillian Welch.
  Acony Belle Lambton, the youngest daughter of Edward Lambton, 7th Earl of Durham.